XHLC-FM may refer to:

XHLC-FM (Guadalajara), FM Globo 98.7 FM
XHLC-FM (Michoacán) in La Piedad, Radio Pía 92.7 FM and 980 AM